Mathias Loras (August 30, 1792 – February 19, 1858) was an immigrant French priest to the United States and the first bishop of the Dubuque Diocese in what would become the state of Iowa.

Early life and ministry
Pierre-Jean-Mathias Loras was born in Lyon, France, on August 30, 1792. He was a descendant of a French noble of the robe family. During the Reign of Terror in France, Loras' father and 17 members of his family were put to death by guillotine.
 
As a young man, he studied for the priesthood, along with St. John Vianney (Curé d'Ars). He was ordained a priest around 1817 by Cardinal Joseph Fesch for the Archdiocese of Lyon. He soon became the Superior of the seminary of Largentiere. He subsequently resigned from this position to join a group of priests conducting parish missions in the Archdiocese of Lyon.

Bishop-elect Michael Portier of the Mobile had gone to France to recruit priests for his diocese. On November 1, 1829, he left with Portier for Alabama. They reached New Orleans on Christmas Eve. Upon arrival at Mobile on January 3, Loras assisted with Portier's installation. Loras was appointed vicar general for the Diocese of Mobile and assigned the task of completing the training of the seminarians who had accompanied Portier to America. He was also named rector of the Cathedral of the Immaculate Conception, and helped Portier recruit priests to serve the diocese. From 1830–1832 he served as the first president of Spring Hill College.

Bishop of Dubuque

In 1837, the third Provincial Council of Baltimore recommended to the pope that new dioceses be created due to the expansion of the United States. Pope Gregory XVI established the Diocese of Dubuque on July 28, 1837, and Loras was named its first bishop. He was consecrated on December 10, 1837, by Portier in Mobile. The principal co-consecrator was the bishops Anthony Blanc of New Orleans, assisted by John Stephen Bazin of Vincennes.

Loras knew little of his new diocese and wrote to Joseph Rosati of St. Louis to inquire what he might find there. Rosati, whose diocese the territory was taken from, probably knew little as the territory was mostly wilderness. The diocese probably had 30,000 Native Americans, and perhaps 43,000 white inhabitants, of which fewer than 3,000 of those people were Catholic. There were three parishes, an Indian mission, and one priest Samuel Charles Mazzuchelli. The diocesan territory consisted of present-day Iowa, most of Minnesota, and North and South Dakota east of the Missouri River. On July 4, 1838, the area would become the Iowa Territory. Loras named Mazzuchelli vicar general and administrator of the diocese because Loras was not traveling to his new diocese just yet.

Loras traveled to France to recruit missionaries and gather funds for his diocese. Upon returning, he spent the late winter and early spring in St. Louis waiting for more favorable conditions to travel to Dubuque. There he met notable explorer Jean Nicholas Nicollet who gave Loras insights on his new diocese. On April 19, 1839, Loras arrived in Dubuque for the first time. He brought with him Joseph Cretin, who in 1851 was consecrated first Bishop of St. Paul, J.A.M. Pelamourgues, who would spend his career in the diocese based at St. Anthony's Church in Davenport, and seminarians Augustin Ravoux who would become a noted missionary among the Native Americans, Lucien Galtier, Remigius Petiot, and James Causse who were pioneer priests in Minnesota. Later that year, he consecrated St. Raphael's Church, Iowa's first church congregation of any denomination, as his cathedral.

His connections and influence in Europe had enabled him to secure necessary financial assistance from the Society for the Propagation of the Faith of Lyons, France, the Leopoldine Society of Vienna, Austria, and the Foreign Mission Society of Munich, Bavaria. In 1846 when Loras discovered German Catholic immigrants thirty miles west of Dubuque, he convinced them to name their community New Vienna in honor of the Austrian capital and home of one of his benefactors.

Over the next 19 years, Loras guided the Dubuque Diocese during its formative years. He established several missions among the Native American tribes. Loras also established several schools, as well as parishes in every populated area of the diocese. In 1839 he established St. Raphael's Seminary, a forerunner of Loras College. Mother Mary Frances Clarke and the Sisters of Charity of the Blessed Virgin Mary came to Dubuque in 1843. Loras visited Mount Melleray Abbey in Ireland in 1849 and expressed his desire to have the Trappists establish a monastery in his diocese. Clement Smyth and six monks came to Dubuque County that same year and established New Melleray Abbey. When they had completed the first buildings, another 16 monks arrived to join them.

Not satisfied with St. Raphael's Seminary in Dubuque, Loras moved the school south of Dubuque to an area known today as Key West. The new school, renamed St. Bernard's College and Seminary, was plagued with financial problems but managed to survive until Loras' death.

Loras also encouraged immigrants to come to Iowa from the more crowded conditions in the eastern U.S. Soon, Dubuque had growing Irish and German populations. Even though he welcomed immigrants to the area, tensions between immigrant groups caused Loras some of his greatest difficulties.

The Germans felt that Loras had not done enough to give them clergy of German descent. The Irish felt slighted when Loras provided the Germans with their parish, Holy Trinity (now Saint Mary's). Some immigrants threatened to withhold contributions to the church. Loras fled the city on two occasions and threatened to withdraw all the clergy from the city. However, tempers eventually cooled, and neither side followed through on their threats.

On July 19, 1850, Pope Pius IX established the Diocese of Saint Paul. The Diocese of Dubuque had been reduced to the boundaries of the state of Iowa, which had been established in 1846.

In the 1850s, under the direction of Loras, the present cathedral church was begun. This was the third building for St.Raphael's parish, and it was over three times the size of the old cathedral. Loras did not live long enough to see this cathedral completed, but he could offer the first mass in this new structure at Christmas, 1857.

By the late 1850s, Loras found that his health was failing. He asked the Holy See to name a coadjutor bishop to assist him. On January 9, 1857, Clement Smyth, prior at New Melleray, was appointed as coadjutor bishop.
As the Dubuque Diocese grew in size Loras wrote to Pope Pius IX in May 1857, and in the letter stated that he was considering asking for the Dubuque Diocese to be divided, with Keokuk as the See city for the new diocese. However this was not done in his lifetime.

Although he had been sick for some time, Loras' death still came suddenly on Friday, February 19, 1858, in Dubuque at 65. Before his death, Loras had been seriously ill but had seemed to be recovering well, even up to the evening of February 18. At about 8:30 on the 18th, he informed his staff that he was retiring for the evening. He ordered them not to disturb him unless necessary, as the divine office he wanted to pray was long, and he wanted to make sure he finished. Around 11:00 PM, his housekeeper heard Loras moaning and informed Father McCabe, who proceeded to the Bishop's room and found him collapsed on the floor. During the night, his condition worsened steadily, and sometime between five and six in the morning on February 19, he died.

A funeral Mass was held the following Sunday at 9:00 am. The body of Loras was taken from the old cathedral to the new cathedral for a full service led by Smyth. After the Mass, Loras was buried within the mortuary chapel of the cathedral.

At the time of his death, the Diocese of Dubuque had grown to 54,000 Catholics, in 60 parishes, served by 48 priests in a territory that now only covered the state of Iowa.

Legacy
Bishop Loras is still remembered as one of the pioneers of the Catholic Church in Iowa. The college run by the archdiocese in Dubuque, which had numerous name changes in its history, was named after Loras in 1939. Loras Boulevard in Dubuque was also named in his memory. In 2020, his statue was removed from Loras Boulevard to after evidence surfaced that Loras had funded some of his missionary work using money earned from the labor of a enslaved person he owned in Alabama.

References

External links
 

1792 births
1858 deaths
19th-century Roman Catholic bishops in the United States
French emigrants to the United States
Clergy from Lyon
Roman Catholic Archdiocese of Mobile
Roman Catholic bishops of Dubuque
Religious leaders from Alabama
Spring Hill College
American Servants of God
Loras College
French nobility
Catholicism-related controversies